Prassilus or Prassilos, or Prasstilus or Prasstilos (Πράσστιλος), or Praxilus or Praxilos (Πράξιλος), was a town of the Chalcidice in ancient Macedonia. It belonged to the Delian League since it appears in the tribute records of Athens of 421/0 BCE, where it paid a phoros of 900 drachmas. It is cited by Stephanus of Byzantium, who places it in Macedonia.

Its site is unlocated, but was probably located in the region of Bottiaea.

References

Populated places in ancient Macedonia
Former populated places in Greece
Geography of ancient Chalcidice
Members of the Delian League
Lost ancient cities and towns